Phil Johnston (born 19 September 1990) is a Scottish footballer who plays as a defender. Johnston has previously played for Airdrie United, Dumbarton, Stirling Albion and Clyde. He signed for Clydebank in July 2017.

He has also played for the Junior Scotland team.

References

1990 births
Living people
Scottish footballers
Airdrieonians F.C. players
Dumbarton F.C. players
Stirling Albion F.C. players
Clyde F.C. players
Scottish Football League players
Scottish Professional Football League players
Association football midfielders
Clydebank F.C. players
Scottish Junior Football Association players
Scotland junior international footballers
Footballers from Glasgow